Gazipur is a city in central Bangladesh. It is located in the Gazipur District. It is a hub for the textile industry in Bangladesh. Its other name is Joydebpur.

Demographics 
Population of Gazipur Municipality by year:

 
In 2013, a new local government entity called the Gazipur City Corporation was formed by merging the municipalities of Gazipur and Tongi, together with large rural areas (i.e. Pubail union, Gaccha Union, Kayaltia Union, Kashimpur Union, Konabari Union and Bashan Union). The population of the Gazipur City Corporation was approximately six million in 2020.

Administration

Health 
Air pollution levels in Gazipur (in Dhaka, Bangladesh) are extremely unhealthy. In 2020, annual average PM2.5 Air Pollution in Gazipur stood at 94.6 µg/m³, which is almost 18.9 times the World Health Organization PM2.5 Guideline (5 µg/m³: set in September, 2021). These pollution levels are estimated to reduce the Life Expectancy of an average person living in Gazipur by 8.8 years.

Notable people
 Tajuddin Ahmed – the first Prime Minister of Bangladesh
 Meghnad Saha – scientist 
 Sohel Taj– Politician 
 Hannan Shah - politician
 Ahsanullah Master, MP

See also
 Bishwa Ijtema
 List of cities in Bangladesh
 Gazipur Sadar Upazila
 Kapasia

References

 
Populated places in Dhaka Division
Cities in Bangladesh